Lambrechts is a Dutch patronymic surname (Lambrecht's son). It is most common in Belgium (6207 people in 2008). Variant forms are Lambrecht, Lambregts, Lambrichs, Lambrichts and Lamprecht. In the 18th century, the name was introduced in Norway. People with this surname include:

Annie Lambrechts (born c.1950), Belgian roller skate racer
Burger Lambrechts (born 1973), South African shot putter
Charles Lambrechts (1753–1825), Belgian-born Minister of Justice of France during the French Revolution
Cor Lambregts (born 1958), Dutch long-distance runner
Diether Lambrechts (born 1976), Belgian geneticist
Esther Lambrechts (1919–2011), Flemish singer known as La Esterella
Finn Lambrechts (1900–1956), Norwegian military officer
Flor Lambrechts (1910–1990), Belgian football forward
Frits Lambrechts (born 1937), Dutch actor and singer
Gerrits Lambrechts (1666–1705), Flemish/Dutch printmaker
Jan Baptist Lambrechts (1680-aft.1731), Flemish genre painter
Jos Lambrechts (1936–2015), Belgian sprinter
Kerstiaen Lambrechts (early 17th century–1659), Flemish painter
Lambrecht Lambrechts (1865–1932), Belgian Flemish-language poet
Marcel Lambrechts(born 1931), Belgian sprinter
Morten Diderik Emil Lambrechts (1824–1900), Norwegian jurist and politician
Paul Lambrichts (born 1954), Belgian football defender
Sigurd Lambrechts (1863–1941), Norwegian civil servant
Thorstein Lambrechts (1856–1933), Norwegian bookseller

See also
Hugo Lambrechts Music Centre, classical music educational center in Cape Town 
Woluwe-Saint-Lambert (Sint-Lambrechts-Woluwe), municipality in the Brussels-Capital Region

References

Dutch-language surnames
Patronymic surnames